Professor Alexander Grossmann started out as a researcher and lecturer, working variously at the University of Tübingen, the Jülich Research Centre, and the Max Planck Institute in Munich.

In 2001, Prof. Grossmann took a career shift and moved into scholarly publishing. He first took a position at Wiley-Blackwell, and then moved to Springer-Verlag GmbH in Vienna where he was Managing Director. Subsequently, Grossmann became vice president at scientific publishing house De Gruyter.

In 2013, Prof. Grossmann partnered with Tibor Tscheke, a Boston-based entrepreneur and software developer, and together they founded a for-profit open access publishing platform called ScienceOpen.

At around the same time, Grossmann took a post as Professor of Publishing Management at the Leipzig University of Applied Sciences.

References

Living people
Academic staff of the University of Tübingen
Year of birth missing (living people)
Place of birth missing (living people)
Academic staff of Leipzig University